This is a list of the 81 members of the European Parliament for West Germany in the 1984 to 1989 session.

List

References

Germany
List
1984